Foulby is a village in the county of West Yorkshire, England. It is situated near Nostell, between Crofton and Ackworth Moor Top, on the A638 east-south east of the city of Wakefield. The village falls within the Ackworth, North Elmsall and Upton ward of Wakefield Metropolitan District Council.

The boundary between the civil parishes of Huntwick with Foulby and Nostell (to the south east) and Sharlston (to the north west) runs through the village.

Persons
John Harrison (24 March 1693 – 24 March 1776) was an English carpenter and clock designer, who solved the problem of calculating longitude through the carrying of precise time on board ship, was born in this tiny village.  There is a blue plaque on the house where he was born beside the main Wakefield to Doncaster road.
Windmill Inn the site of a former windmill designed by John Smeaton in 1786. This is now an Indian restaurant called Arkaan's.

References

External links

 
Villages in West Yorkshire
Geography of the City of Wakefield